Roberto Punčec (born 27 October 1991) is a Croatian professional footballer who plays as a defender for Bulgarian First League club Botev Plovdiv.

Club career
A product of NK Varteks youth academy, Punčec joined the first team in the 2008–09 season and had his professional debut on 2 November 2008 in a league match against Hajduk Split. He went on to appear in 27 matches for the club in his first two professional seasons, with the club changing its name to NK Varaždin in mid-2010.

After filing for arbitration to Croatian Football Federation his contract with the financially troubled Varaždin was terminated due to unpaid wages, and on 31 August 2011, Punčec signed a two-year contract with Maccabi Tel Aviv.

In July 2012, Punčec joined Union Berlin on a season-long loan with the option to buy. Following five years with Union Berlin, in June 2017, Punčec joined Rijeka on a three-year deal as a free-agent.

On 4 December 2019, it was announced Punčec would join Major League Soccer club Sporting Kansas City ahead of the 2020 season. Following the 2021 season, Punčec's contract option was declined by Kansas City.

International career
Punčec has been capped at every youth level for the Croatian national team, and was part of Croatia's squad at the 2011 FIFA U-20 World Cup in Colombia, playing in all three of their group stage matches.

Career statistics

Honours

Rijeka
 Croatian Cup: 2019

References

External links
 

1991 births
Living people
Sportspeople from Varaždin
Association football defenders
Croatian footballers
Croatia youth international footballers
Croatia under-21 international footballers
NK Varaždin players
Maccabi Tel Aviv F.C. players
1. FC Union Berlin players
HNK Rijeka players
Sporting Kansas City players
Botev Plovdiv players
Croatian Football League players
Israeli Premier League players
2. Bundesliga players
Major League Soccer players
First Professional Football League (Bulgaria) players
Croatian expatriate footballers
Expatriate footballers in Israel
Croatian expatriate sportspeople in Israel
Expatriate footballers in Germany
Croatian expatriate sportspeople in Germany
Expatriate soccer players in the United States
Croatian expatriate sportspeople in the United States
Expatriate footballers in Bulgaria
Croatian expatriate sportspeople in Bulgaria